Allen Pitts (born June 28, 1964) is a former receiver for the Calgary Stampeders in the Canadian Football League from 1990 to 2000. He attended Cal-State Fullerton and played his entire professional career as a receiver for the Calgary Stampeders.  He retired as the CFL's all-time leading receiver in term of career yardage until he was passed by Milt Stegall in 2008.

Career 
Pitts holds many Stampeder records including most career touchdowns with 117, which at the time was also a CFL record, and held the CFL All-Time receiving yards with 14,891 until September 12, 2008, when Milt Stegall broke the record; Pitts still holds the record for receiving yards by a Stampeder.  He played in 5 Grey Cup games, and was instrumental in two Grey Cup victories in 1992 and 1998. In 1992 Pitts became the second CFL player to have more than one season with at least 100 receptions, but the first player to do so in consecutive seasons. The year prior, Pitts had 118 catches for 1764 yards and 15 touchdowns and then had 103 catches for 1591 yards and 13 touchdowns. Injuries in 1993 saw Pitts accumulate 45 receptions for 776 yards and 4 scores in just 7 games. However, he had a monster year in 1994 setting a new receiving yards record with 2036, a receptions record with 126, and a touchdown record with 21. The latter two have since been eclipsed by other players. The power of the Stampeders' passing attack was proved in 1995 despite a serious injury to star quarterback Doug Flutie. The rise of Jeff Garcia saw the two combine for over 3,000 yards, which gave Pitts 100 catches for 1492 yards and 11 touchdowns. Remarkably he was the team's second leading receiver, behind David Sapunjis (111-1653-12). This marked the first time a CFL team had two receivers with 100 or more receptions in the same season. Despite a very respectable season in 2000 with 77 catches for 1045 yards and six scores, the Stampeders chose to release the great receiver and he then retired rather than playing for another team.

At the time of his retirement, Pitts held the record for career receptions with 966 but has since been passed by Darren Flutie with 972 and by Terry Vaughn with 1006. Currently Pitts shares the record for most games in a season with 100 more yards at 11 with Terry Greer, Hal Patterson, and Joey Walters. He also holds the career record for plus 100 yard receiving games with 64.

Perhaps remarkably Pitts was the Stampeder nominee for the CFL's Most Outstanding Player Award twice in his career. The first in 1991, losing the division acknowledgment to Doug Flutie who was then with the Lions. His second came in 1999 and was the runner-up to Danny McManus of the Tiger-Cats. Being on a team that included, over the years, quarterbacks Doug Flutie, Jeff Garcia, and Dave Dickenson plus Kelvin Anderson at running back perhaps made being the team's award-nominee more difficult.

He was elected into the Canadian Football Hall of Fame in 2006.  He was enshrined on the Stampeders Wall of Fame in 2005, with the retirement of his jersey number 18. In November, 2006, Allen Pitts was voted one of the CFL's Top 50 players (#10) of the league's modern era by Canadian sports network The Sports Network/TSN.

Statistics

References

External links 
 Allen Pitts at the Canadian Football Hall of Fame

1964 births
American football wide receivers
American players of Canadian football
Cal State Fullerton Titans football players
Calgary Stampeders players
Canadian Football Hall of Fame inductees
Canadian football slotbacks
Living people
Players of American football from Tucson, Arizona